Guarnaschelli is an Italian surname. Notable people with the surname include:

 Alex Guarnaschelli (born 1972), American chef, daughter of Maria
 Maria Guarnaschelli (1941–2021), American cookbook editor and publisher

Italian-language surnames